Alexey Andreyevich Chernyshyov (born on 29 March 1939) is a Russian politician who served as the 2nd Governor of Orenburg Oblast, Russia. He is a member of the Agrarian Party of Russia. He became the head of the oblast government in 1999. Chernyshyov is active in promoting Russia-Kazakhstan trade as Orenburg Oblast shares a long border with Kazakhstan.

References 
 Official website of Orenburg Oblast. Governor of Orenburg Oblast  
 State Duma. Alexey Chernyshyov Profile 

1939 births
Living people
People from Orenburg Oblast
Governors of Orenburg Oblast
Communist Party of the Soviet Union members
First convocation members of the State Duma (Russian Federation)
Second convocation members of the State Duma (Russian Federation)
Members of the Federation Council of Russia (1996–2000)
Members of the Federation Council of Russia (after 2000)